Mark Lane is a disused station on the London Underground. It was served by the Circle and District lines. In 1946 it was renamed Tower Hill.

It was named after Mark Lane, the street on which it is located, slightly west of the current Tower Hill station that replaced it in 1967.

History

Mark Lane station was opened on 6 October 1884 to replace the short-lived Tower of London station, which was closed when the Metropolitan Railway and District Railway were connected to form the Circle line and a larger station was required. 

The station was referred to in early plans as Trinity Square, and later named Seething Lane, but it was ultimately given the more recognisable name Mark Lane (the street on which London's Corn Exchanges were located). On 1 September 1946, the station was renamed Tower Hill.

The station was earmarked for closure due to overwhelming passenger numbers and little space available for expansion. It was closed on 4 February 1967 and the present Tower Hill station was opened as its replacement, located on the same site as the Tower of London station that had closed in 1884.

The underground section of Mark Lane station can still be seen between Monument and Tower Hill, though only one platform on the eastbound track now remains due to redevelopment of the track. The surface station, sited in Seething Lane, can be seen in the form of a pedestrian subway under the road converted from the old station overbridge, where large white grilles now cover the original stairways down to the platforms.

The offices above the station were called Mark Lane Station Buildings, and this sign can still be read above an entrance on Byward Street.

In fiction
The disused station features in the 2017 novel Who Sent Clement by Keith A. Pearson as the fictional hiding place for a gold bar from the 1971 Baker Street robbery. The loot is made as a pay-off to a look-out from the robbery, a former ticket office manager of the then recently closed station.

References

Notes

Bibliography

External links
 London's Abandoned Tube Stations – Mark Lane

Circle line (London Underground) stations
District line stations
Tube stations in the City of London
Disused railway stations in the City of London
Disused London Underground stations
Former Metropolitan and Metropolitan District Joint Railway stations
Railway stations in Great Britain opened in 1884
Railway stations in Great Britain closed in 1967